This is a list of mayors of Marlborough, Massachusetts, USA. Marlborough became a city in 1890, previously it was a town, and as a town was administered by a Board of Selectmen.

External links
 List of the Mayors of Marlborough, from The City of Marlborough
Marlborough